The 1964 Sugar Bowl was the thirtieth edition of the college football bowl game, played at Tulane Stadium in New Orleans, Louisiana, on Wednesday, January 1. Part of the 1963–64 bowl game season, it matched the seventh-ranked Ole Miss Rebels and the #8 Alabama Crimson Tide, both of the Southeastern Conference (SEC), although the two teams had not met in years.

The matchup was the first between the flagship universities of these neighboring states in almost two decades (1944), and only the second in over thirty years.  In a defensive struggle, Alabama upset the Rebels 12–7 without scoring a touchdown.

New Orleans received a rare substantial snowfall of  the previous day, and cleared snow lay in large banks around the edges of the field.

Teams

Alabama

This was Bear Bryant's sixth season as head coach at Alabama. The Crimson Tide lost to Florida and long-time rival Auburn en route to an 8–2 regular season. Originally wanting to pit Navy against Ole Miss, the Sugar Bowl extended the invitation to Alabama with two weeks remaining in the regular season. This was their seventeenth bowl appearance and the fourth in the Sugar Bowl.

On December 9, several days prior to the regular season finale against Miami, junior quarterback Joe Namath was suspended for the remainder of the season by Bryant. Sophomore Steve Sloan started at quarterback for the Crimson Tide in the final two games.

Mississippi

The 1963 squad was Johnny Vaught's seventeenth as head coach at Ole Miss. The Rebels did not lose a regular season game, but tied Memphis State and long-time rival Mississippi State en route to a 7–0–2 record. This was their twelfth bowl appearance and the seventh in the Sugar Bowl.

Game summary
The Sugar Bowl kicked off at 1 pm CST, as did the Cotton and Orange Bowls.

The game was a defensive slugfest, with thirteen turnovers and nine punts. Alabama scored its first points on a 31-yard field goal by Tim Davis. In the second quarter, Davis kicked field goals of 46 and 22-yards to give Alabama a 9–0 lead at halftime.

In the third quarter, Davis had a 48-yard field goal to extend the Alabama lead to 12–0. Early in the fourth quarter, Ole Miss scored the only touchdown of the game when Perry Lee Dunn threw a five-yard touchdown pass to Larry Smith. Alabama then held their lead and won the game 12–7. For his four field goal performance, Tim Davis was named the Sugar Bowl MVP.

Scoring

Statistics
{| class=wikitable style="text-align:center"
! Statistics !! Alabama !! Ole Miss
|-
|First downs||14||9
|-
|Rushing||58–165||27–77
|-
|Passing||3–11–1||11–21–3
|-
|Passing yards||29||171
|-
|Total offense||69–194||48–248
|-
|Punts–avg.||5–36.8||4–44.0
|-
|Fumbles–lost||6–3||11–6
|-
|Turnovers||4||9
|-
|Penalties–yards||3–15||5–45
|}

See also
 Alabama–Ole Miss football rivalry

References

Sugar Bowl
Sugar Bowl
Alabama Crimson Tide football bowl games
Ole Miss Rebels football bowl games
Sugar Bowl
Sugar Bowl